UHK may refer to:

UHK, the DS100 code for Hermsdorf-Klosterlausnitz station, Thuringia, Germany
University of Hradec Králové, a public university in eastern Bohemia, Czech Republic